Wyoming Highway 50 (WYO 50) is a  north–south Wyoming state highway located in the southwestern and central part of Campbell County that travels from Wyoming Highway 387 at Pine Tree Junction north to Interstate 90, US 14/US 16/WYO 59 in Gillette.

Route description
Wyoming Highway 50 starts at Wyoming Highway 387 in an area called Pine Tree Junction, located in southwestern Campbell County. WYO 50 heads due north, named 4J Road, and passes through the community of Savageton. Eighteen miles north of Savageton, Highway 50 turns and runs southwest to northeast until it reaches Gillette. Southwest of Gillette, at approximately 49 miles, WYO 50 changes names to Skyline Drive, as 4J Road, the old routing of WYO 50 into Gillette turns east. Highway 50 continues north-northeast into Gillette, intersecting Interstate 90 (Exit 124) and the south end of I-90 Business. I-90 BUS runs concurrent with WYO 50 for a short distance until WYO 50's northern terminus at a "T" intersection with US 14/US 16/WYO 59. I-90 BUS continues east from here overlapping US 14/US 16/ WYO 59.

History
Wyoming Highway 50 originally had a different routing into the city of Gillette. According to a 1980 Wyoming state map, WYO 50 was formerly routed along 4J Road into Gillette. Sometime between 1980 and 1993, WYO 50 was moved from 4J Road to Skyline Drive, which provides easier access to Interstate 90.

Major intersections

References

 Official 2003 State Highway Map of Wyoming

External links 

 Wyoming State Routes 000-099
 WYO 50 - I-90 Bus/US 14/US 16/WYO 59 to I-90/I-90 Bus
 WYO 50 - I-90/I-90 Bus to WYO 387
 City of Gillette website

Transportation in Campbell County, Wyoming
050